The 1913–14 North Carolina Tar Heels men's basketball team (variously "North Carolina", "Carolina" or "Tar Heels") was the fourth varsity college basketball team to represent the University of North Carolina.

Roster and schedule

Practice for the upcoming season, along with try-outs, was scheduled to start in November. Meb Long was announced as captain for the team. The Tar Heel reported that practices typically last around two hours, including time for dressing and showering. Long put together a preliminary schedule that was published by The Tar Heel on December 11. The schedule included fourteen games, three of which were to happen before the new year. The schedule included a game in Raleigh against University of Georgia, Virginia Agricultural and Mechanical College and Polytechnic Institute (V.P.I.), and the University of Virginia, among others. In advance of the first game, the team was practicing every day. A writer for The Tar Heel that the talent for the upcoming season was the best there had been since basketball started in 1910–11. Coach Nathaniel Cartmell felt that the team would "clean up everybody" the team faced.

|+ Schedule
|-
!colspan=6 style="background:#4B9CD3; color:#FFFFFF;"| Regular season

References

Footnotes

Citations

Bibliography

North Carolina
North Carolina Tar Heels men's basketball seasons
North Carolina Tar Heels Men's Basketball
North Carolina Tar Heels Men's Basketball